The Winner's Crime is the second novel  of  The Winner’s Trilogy, written by Marie Rutkoski. The Winner’s Crime is a story about a girl called Kestrel, the daughter of a soldier. It is fantasy novel with mystery.
 The Huffington Post rated it as the best young adult sequel book of 2015.

References 

2015 American novels
Young adult fantasy novels
Farrar, Straus and Giroux books